Patrick Hanratty is the name of: 

 Patrick J. Hanratty, (born c. 1941), computer scientist and businessman
 Patrick Hanratty (bishop), 17th-century Roman Catholic Bishop of Dromore and Bishop of Down and Connor

See also
Pat Hanratty, politician